"A Lover's Question" is a 1958 Pop, R&B hit for Clyde McPhatter.  The single was written by Brook Benton and Jimmy T. Williams and was Clyde McPhatter's most successful Pop and R&B release. The bass singer is Noah Hopkins.  "A Lover's Question" made it to #6 on the Billboard Hot 100 and was #1 for one week on the R&B chart.

Background
The best-known version of the song is in    mono. However, a stereo version was released on the LP Atlantic History of Rhythm & Blues, Vol. 4, along with several other rare stereo versions of late 1950s Atlantic hits.

Jacky Ward version

In 1978, Jacky Ward had a successful remake of the song, peaking at #3 on the Billboard Hot Country Singles chart.

Charts

Weekly charts

Year-end charts

Other cover versions
In 1961, a cover by Ernestine Anderson reached #98.
In 1969, a cover by Otis Redding reached #48.
Jay and the Americans released a cover version of the song on their 1970 album, Wax Museum, Vol. 1.
In 1975, Loggins & Messina's cover reached #89.
Country singer Del Reeves took the song to #14 on the Hot Country Singles chart in 1970.

See also
List of number-one R&B singles of 1958 (U.S.)

References

1958 songs
1958 singles
1978 singles
Clyde McPhatter songs
Del Reeves songs
Jacky Ward songs
Jay and the Americans songs
Songs written by Brook Benton
Mercury Records singles